The Match-Breaker is a lost 1921 American silent romantic comedy film produced and distributed by Metro Pictures. It was directed by Dallas M. Fitzgerald and starred Viola Dana.

Cast
Viola Dana as Jane Morgan
Jack Perrin as Thomas Butler Jr
Edward Jobson as Thomas Butler Sr.
Julia Calhoun as Mrs. Murray
Wedgwood Nowell as Hack De Long
Kate Toncray as Aunt Martha
Lenore Lynard as Madge Larlane
Fred Kelsey as Detective
Arthur Millett as Richard Van Loytor

References

External links

1921 films
American silent feature films
Lost American films
Metro Pictures films
1921 romantic comedy films
American romantic comedy films
American black-and-white films
Films directed by Dallas M. Fitzgerald
1920s American films
Silent romantic comedy films
Silent American comedy films